Nilambur Road railway station is a railway terminus serving the town of Nilambur in the Malappuram district of Kerala. It is the station of the Shoranur–Nilambur Road spur rail line of Palakkad Division of Southern Railways. Trains halting at the station connect the town to prominent cities in Kerala such as Palakkad, Ernakulam, Kottayam and Thiruvananthapuram.

Shoranur–Nilambur railway line
The Nilambur–Shoranur line is a spur line of the Southern Railway Zone in Kerala state and one of the shortest broad-gauge railway lines in India and the only terminus railway station in Kerala. It is a single non-electrified line with  length running from Shoranur Junction (in Palakkad district) to Nilambur railway station (in Malappuram district).  This station is 4 km from the town of Nilambur on the Kozhikode–Ooty highway. Shoranur–Nilambur Road passenger trains are running on this route.

References

Nilambur–Shoranur railway line
Palakkad railway division
Railway stations in Malappuram district
Railway terminus in India